Basma Riaz Choudhry also spelt Baasima (Urdu: بسمہ ریاض چوہدری) is a Member of the Provincial Assembly of Punjab. She is the daughter of Chaudhry Riaz Asghar, (brother-in-law of Chaudhry Shujaat Hussain). The first time she was elected as Member of the Provincial Assembly of Punjab in by-election 2005. She returned to Punjab Assembly in general elections 2013 and 2018 against one of the seats reserved for women.

She took part in the general elections 2008 from the Constituency PP-117 (Mandi Bahuddin-II) as the candidate of Pakistan Muslim League (Q) for the  second time, but was defeated by the PPPP candidate Asif Bashir Bhagat. She belongs to PML-Q.

Chaudhry was born on March 5, 1977, in Chicago. She obtained a B.Sc. in Management Marketing in 1998, and obtained her Master of Computer Science from DePaul University in Chicago in 2001. She is the niece of Chaudhry Shujaat Hussain.

References

Basma Riaz
1960 births
Living people
Punjab MPAs 2018–2023
Women members of the Provincial Assembly of the Punjab
21st-century Pakistani women politicians